Scapania sphaerifera is a species of plants in the family Scapaniaceae. It is endemic to Russia, and was first described in 1936 in Murmansk. Its natural habitat is rocky areas.

References

Scapaniaceae
Vulnerable plants
Endemic flora of Russia
Taxonomy articles created by Polbot
Plants described in 1936